Bruce Robbins may refer to:

Bruce Robbins (academic) (born 1949), American academic
Bruce Robbins (baseball) (born 1959), American former baseball pitcher